David Buitenweg (29 October 1898 – 9 April 1968) was a Dutch footballer. He played in one match for the Netherlands national football team in 1921.

References

External links
 

1898 births
1968 deaths
Dutch footballers
Netherlands international footballers
Footballers from Utrecht (city)
Association football forwards
SBV Vitesse players
USV Hercules players